Peter Smith may refer to:

Arts and entertainment 
Peter Smith (oboist), American oboist with the Philadelphia Orchestra
Peter Smith (painter) (born 1967), contemporary British painter
Peter C. Smith (born 1940), British author of aeronautical, naval and military history books
Peter Moore Smith (born 1965), American writer
Peter Purves Smith (1912–1949), Australian artist
Peter Smith, member of the British boyband Phixx

Politicians 
Peter Smith (Canadian politician) (1877–1934), Canadian politician involved in the Ontario Bond Scandal
Peter Smith (diplomat) (born 1942), governor of the Cayman Islands, 1999–2002
Peter Smith, Baron Smith of Leigh (1945–2021), leader of Wigan council and member of the House of Lords
Peter J. Smith (politician) (1867–1947), Wisconsin state senator
Peter Plympton Smith (born 1945), lieutenant-governor and congressman from Vermont, president of California State University, Monterey Bay

Sports

Association football (soccer)
Peter Smith (English footballer, born 1935), English footballer (Gillingham)
Peter Smith (English footballer, born 1969), English footballer (Brighton & Hove Albion)
Peter Smith (English footballer, born 1980), English footballer (Exeter City)
Peter Smith (English footballer, born 1985), English footballer (Hong Kong Football Club)
Peter Smith (Scottish footballer) (born 1937), Scottish footballer
Peter Smith (Welsh footballer) (born 1978), retired Welsh professional footballer

Cricket
Peter Smith (Australian cricketer) (born 1968), Australian cricketer
Peter Smith (English cricketer, born 1908) (1908–1967), English cricketer
Peter Smith (English cricketer, born 1934), English former cricketer
Peter Smith (English cricketer, born 1944), former English cricketer
Peter Smith (New Zealand cricketer) (1935–2013), New Zealand cricketer

Other sports
Peter Smith (curler) (born 1964), Scottish curler
Peter Smith (Australian footballer, born 1960), Australian rules footballer at North Melbourne and Brisbane
Peter Smith (ice hockey), current head coach of the Canadian national women's hockey team
Peter Smith (rugby league, born 1955), rugby league international for Great Britain and England
Peter Smith (rugby league, born 1958), Australian rugby league player
Peter Smith (rugby union) (1924–1954), New Zealand rugby player
Peter V. Smith (born 1947), Australian rules footballer and son of Norm Smith

Scientists and engineers

Peter Smith (biologist), professor at the University of Aberdeen
Peter Smith (epidemiologist) (born 1942), professor of tropical epidemiology
Peter Smith (computer scientist), emeritus professor at the University of Sunderland
Peter Smith (physicist), American physicist, principal investigator for the Phoenix spacecraft Mars mission
Peter K. Smith (born 1943), British professor of psychology

Other 
Peter Smith (bishop) (1943–2020), Roman Catholic Archbishop of Southwark (formerly the Archbishop of Cardiff)
Peter Smith (businessman) (born 1946), English businessman, currently chairman of estate agents Savills
Peter Smith (historian), British historian specializing in Bahá'í studies
Peter Smith (judge) (born 1952), judge of the High Court of England and Wales
Peter Smith (trade unionist) (1940–2006), general secretary of the British trade union, the Association of Teachers and Lecturers
Peter H. Smith (born 1940), former president of the Latin American Studies Association
Peter J. Smith, United States Attorney for the United States District Court for the Middle District of Pennsylvania, 2010–2016
Peter Leslie Smith (born 1958), South African–born American Catholic bishop
Peter W. Smith (1936–2017), American investment banker and Republican activist
Peter J. Smith (attorney) (born 1949), American attorney
Peter Smith (architectural historian) (1926–2013)

See also
Pete Smith (disambiguation)
Peter Smyth (disambiguation)
Peter Smythe (disambiguation)